Ivor 'Bill' Brown (8 March 1914 – 10 October 1980) is a former Australian rules footballer who played for the Carlton Football Club and Collingwood Football Club in the Victorian Football League (VFL).

Notes

External links 

Bill Brown's profile at Blueseum

1914 births
1980 deaths
Carlton Football Club players
Collingwood Football Club players
Australian rules footballers from Victoria (Australia)